The 1979 Toray Sillook Open was a women's singles tennis tournament played on indoor carpet courts at Yoyogi National Gymnasium in Tokyo in Japan. The event was part of the AAAA category of the 1979 Colgate Series. It was the seventh edition of the tournament and was held from 11 September through 16 September 1979. Sixth-seeded Billie Jean King won the title and earned $32,000 first-prize money. By reaching the final Evonne Goolagong Cawley became the fourth female player to break the mark of $1 million in prize-money.

Finals

Singles
 Billie Jean King defeated  Evonne Goolagong Cawley 6–4, 7–5
It was King's 1st singles title of the year and the 122nd of her career.

Prize money

Notes

References

External links
 International Tennis Federation (ITF) tournament event details
 Women's Tennis Association (WTA) tournament event details

Toray Sillook Open
Pan Pacific Open
Toray Sillook Open
Toray Sillook Open
Toray Sillook Open
Toray Sillook Open